Deep Bay is an unincorporated area on the east coast of Vancouver Island, in British Columbia, Canada across Baynes Sound from Denman Island which has a government marina in a naturally protected harbour.  It is situated on Highway 19A north of Qualicum Beach between Fanny Bay and Bowser.

Deep Bay is the home of the Deep Bay Marine Field Station.

The Island Rail Corridor passes through the area.

References

External links
 Deep Bay Harbour Authority web site
 Aerial Photo of Deep Bay Fisheries and Oceans Canada, Accessed October 23, 2011

Unincorporated settlements in British Columbia
Populated places in the Regional District of Nanaimo
Bays of British Columbia
Ports and harbours of British Columbia